"Nightmare in Silver" is the twelfth and penultimate episode of the seventh series of the British science fiction television series Doctor Who and was first broadcast on BBC One on 11 May 2013. It was written by Neil Gaiman and directed by Stephen Woolfenden.

In the episode, the alien time traveller the Doctor (Matt Smith) and the nanny Clara Oswald (Jenna-Louise Coleman) bring Clara's charges Angie (Eve de Leon Allen) and Artie (Kassius Carey Johnson) to an extraterrestrial theme park, where an army of cyborgs called Cybermen reawaken centuries after their defeat in a war. The Cybermen discover the Doctor, and transform him into a "Cyber-Planner", which creates a split personality fighting for control of the Doctor's body with a game of chess.

The episode was the first to feature the Cybermen since the episode "Closing Time" in the previous series. It was watched by 6.64 million viewers in the United Kingdom and received generally positive reviews from critics.

Plot
The Eleventh Doctor takes Clara and her nanny charges Angie and Artie to an extraterrestrial theme park, after they blackmail her about her trips through time. They find the park is closed down and occupied by a punishment platoon, Webley, the theme park's museum curator, and Porridge, a little person who runs the museum's star attraction - a Mechanical Turk-type chess apparatus with a deactivated Cyberman in place of the Turk. There are a number of these deactivated Cybermen around the park, as they were defeated a thousand years ago. The Doctor convinces the platoon that he is an ambassador working for their missing Emperor, and is allowed to stay. An army of Cybermen that were hiding under the park and slowly upgrading their parts wake up and steal Angie and Artie. The Doctor puts Clara in charge of the troops, warning her not to let them destroy the planet while he rescues the children.

The Doctor finds Angie and Artie and is partially upgraded into a Cyberman, sharing the Cyberman super-consciousness, the "Cyberiad". This gives him a split personality as both the Doctor and the "Cyber-Planner", who names himself Mr Clever, share the same body and each control almost half of the brain. The Doctor and Mr Clever agree to play chess for the complete control of the body. Mr Clever is temporarily stopped by the Doctor placing a golden ticket on his face, explaining that the Cybermen's weakness to gold is still present in their current code; Mr Clever soon installs a patch to overcome this weakness.

Clara relocates the platoon to a "comical castle", an attraction at the theme park, where they take stock of minimal arms: one large anti-Cyberman gun with a limited charge, five hand pulsers, and a planet-imploding bomb. The Doctor returns with Angie and Artie, and demands that Clara tie him up to let him finish his chess game, while the platoon hold off poorly against the Cybermen, who can quickly adapt and upgrade to overcome any obstacle. Mr Clever destroys the bomb trigger, leaving the group defenceless. The Doctor uses a hand pulser to remove Mr Clever from his mind. Angie reveals that Porridge is the Emperor — she recognised him from an imperial penny and a waxwork model. The Emperor activates the bomb verbally and signals for an imperial spaceship to teleport them away. At the Doctor's request, Porridge retrieves the Doctor's ship the TARDIS just before the planet implodes, destroying the Cyberman army, however, a single Cybermite survives, floating in the vacuum of space.

Production
Writer Neil Gaiman had previously written the series 6 episode "The Doctor's Wife", which was positively received. Lead writer and executive producer Steven Moffat contacted Gaiman about writing for the series and asked him to make the Cybermen "scary again". Gaiman announced his return to Doctor Who during his Hugo Award acceptance speech for "The Doctor's Wife", commenting that "only a fool or a madman would try again – so [he was] on his third draft now". Gaiman stated that the episode was planned for the second half of series 7, but could be delayed, as happened with "The Doctor's Wife".

On redesigning the Cybermen, Gaiman thought back to classic series serials The Moonbase (1967) and The Tomb of the Cybermen (1967) and decided to "take the 1960s Cybermen and [incorporate] everything that's happened since". However, Gaiman said that he "got completely side-tracked by a mad, strange romp". Moffat stated that the Cybermen were redesigned because they did so often in the classic series, and yet had been consistent in the new series. The previous design of the Cybermen also appear in this episode, but are not the primary threats. Gaiman was motivated to provide a "rationalisation" for the Cybermen in current Doctor Who continuity. The classic series had depicted the Cybermen as alien cyborgs, while the revived series depicted them as human cyborgs from a parallel Earth; Gaiman opined that his Cybermen stemmed from an encounter and amalgamation of these two types of Cybermen following "The Next Doctor".

Warwick Davis stated that it was a "thrill" to be in Doctor Who, especially in an episode with the Cybermen written by Gaiman.

Some location filming took place in early November 2012 at Castell Coch.

Lost script
During filming at Castell Coch, a copy of the readthrough script was found in a taxi in Cardiff. It was marked as being Eve De Leon Allen's copy and had the working title of "The Last Cyberman", which was subsequently changed. The script was found by Hannah Durham, who posted a picture of the script to Facebook with the caption: "found Dr Who script in the back of a taxi. Cheeky spoilers anyone?" It was then posted to Reddit by Dan Rowling with the caption: "Look what a Facebook friend found in a taxi in Cardiff on Monday". Arrangements were then made by Hannah Durham and Dan Rowling to return the script to the BBC.

Broadcast and reception

Broadcast

Overnight viewing figures estimate that the episode was watched by 4.7 million viewers, rising to 6.64 million after calculating the final ratings, making it the ninth most-watched programme of the week on BBC One.

Critical reception
The episode scored 84 on the Appreciation Index, indicating that the public enjoyed it. Media critics gave generally positive reviews to the episode, and Matt Smith and Warwick Davis' performances were universally praised. Dan Martin from The Guardian stated that "The Cybermen are back – and scary for the first time since the 60s, thanks to a whimsical but effective script from Neil Gaiman." Ross Ruediger of New York Magazine wrote that Gaiman "created an amazing yet believable world here — one that felt otherworldly and yet close to home. The designs of the amusement park captivate", and praised the cast, especially Davis' performance. 

Sarah Crompton at The Daily Telegraph gave the episode 4 stars out of 5. She felt that Gaiman succeeded in making the Cybermen scary again, though the episode "could have done with more variation in pace and tone". She also praised Smith and Davis' performances. Simon Brew of Den of Geek called it "a very good episode, and it's worth having a second watch to pick up some of the lovely nods to Who past that have been fused in." He wrote that "You can't help but feel the influence of the Borg from Star Trek in here", and referred to their Borg-like adaptation to specific threats as something that is both "familiar" and which "works in making them feel less beatable". IGN'''s Mark Snow gave a positive review, saying that the episode "still stands up as a solid if underwhelming return for one of Who's most iconic and timeless of villains." He also praised Davis' performance.

Neela Debnath at The Independent called it "another episode which failed to live up to the hype", and said that "Gaiman is a superb writer and his dialogue for the Doctor's internal battle was written well but the other characters felt superfluous and two-dimensional", but praised Smith's performance, calling it "one of the few reasons to watch this episode". Patrick Mulkern of Radio Times was negative, describing it as an "almighty Cyber flop", and comparing it to the "execrable" Silver Nemesis''.

References

External links

Eleventh Doctor episodes
2013 British television episodes
Cybermen television stories
Television shows written by Neil Gaiman
Television episodes set in amusement parks